The Embassy of Honduras in Washington, D.C. is the diplomatic mission of Honduras to the United States. It is located at 1220 19th Street, Northwest, Washington, D.C. Separately, Honduras has a consulate-general located at 1990 M St NW, Washington, D.C.

The embassy also operates consulates-general in Atlanta, Boston, Charlotte, Chicago, Dallas, Houston, Los Angeles, McAllen, Miami, New Orleans, New York City, San Francisco and Seattle.

The ambassador is Luis Fernando Suazo Barahona.

See also
Honduras–United States relations
List of ambassadors of the United States to Honduras
List of diplomatic missions of Honduras
Embassy of Honduras, London

References

External links
Official website 

Honduras
Washington, D.C.
Honduras–United States relations
North Cleveland Park

de:Liste der honduranischen Botschafter in den Vereinigten Staaten